Ervand George Kogbetliantz (February 22, 1888 in Rostov-on-the-Don – 1974 in Paris, France) was an Armenian-American mathematician and the first president of the Yerevan State University. He left Russia in 1918. He received a Doctorate in mathematics from the University of Paris in 1923. His mathematical work was mainly on infinite series, on the theory of orthogonal polynomials, on an algorithm for singular value decomposition which bears his name, on algorithms for the evaluation of elementary functions in computers, and on the enumeration of prime elements of the Gaussian integers. He also invented a three-dimensional version of chess, and was working at his death with Bobby Fischer on a game of chess for three people. When he first went to America (1941), he taught Mathematics at Lehigh University. In the early 1950s, he was a consultant for IBM in New York City and taught at Columbia University. Prior to moving back to Paris and retiring, he was a professor at Rockefeller University.

Articles and books 
 Recherches sur la summabilité des séries ultrasphériques par la méthode des moyennes arithmétiques, J. Math. Pures Appl. 9, 107–187, 1924.
 Fundamentals of mathematics from an advanced viewpoint, 4 volumes, Gordon and Breach Science Publishers, 1968.
 (with Alice Krikorian) Handbook of first complex prime numbers, Gordon and Breach Science Publishers, 1971.

External links 

 Life magazine, 9 June 1952, on his three-dimensional chess board
 Two photos of Kogbetliantz from the Pontigny Conference at Mount Holyoke College in 1944

1888 births
1974 deaths
Deaths from cancer in France
20th-century Armenian mathematicians
Numerical analysts
Singular value decomposition
Academic staff of Yerevan State University
University of Paris alumni
Soviet emigrants to the United States